Siffleur Falls are a series of three separate waterfalls on the Siffleur River, an early tributary of the North Saskatchewan River. The falls are a short distance from the David Thompson Highway, in the Siffleur Wilderness Area, just north of Banff National Park.

Clearwater County, Alberta
Waterfalls of Alberta